SymPowerco is an energy technology company developing the Flowing Electrolyte Direct Methanol Fuel Cell (FE DMFC). SymPowerco’s majority-owned (70%) subsidiary, Polygenic Power Systems or Polygenic Power Corp., is in charge of the development of SymPowerco's various technologies.

FE DMFC has an increased performance of approximately 30% when compared against a direct methanol fuel cell (DMFC). Other advantages of FE DMFC include a better control of temperature distributions in the whole system, and a quick shutdown of the system.

References

External links
SymPowerco official website
2D modeling of a flowing-electrolyte direct methanol fuel cell

Fuel cell manufacturers